Dicranoglossus resplendens is a species of beetle in the family Carabidae, the only species in the genus Dicranoglossus.

References

Anthiinae (beetle)